Richard Philip "Rick" Edwards (born 20 May 1979) is an English television presenter, journalist, and author.  Edwards presented T4 for four years, and has also presented Tool Academy, Freshly Squeezed, E4 Music, and much of Channel 4's 2012 Paralympics coverage. Edwards also hosted the "Fighting Talk" radio show on BBC Radio 5 Live. As a journalist, he has written for The Observer, the Evening Standard and HuffPost. From 2017 to 2021, he has been the presenter of the BBC quiz show Impossible, and since November 2021 he has co-hosted the BBC Radio 5 Live breakfast show (replacing Nicky Campbell), 
usually alongside Rachel Burden.

Early life
Edwards was born on 20 May 1979 at Enfield to Philip G. Edwards and his wife Patricia A. nee Galloway
He went to Portsmouth Grammar School and later attended Pembroke College, Cambridge, studying mathematics originally before changing to natural sciences after his first year. He performed stand-up and sketch shows during his time at university.

Career

Edwards hosted a Saturday evening radio show on XFM entitled The Weekender for several years, hosting his last show on 10 January 2009. He also formed part of the BBC presenting team for their coverage of the Reading and Leeds Festival. In 2011, Edwards began hosting E4's Tool Academy, a reality TV show about fed-up girlfriends who have enrolled their underperforming other halves in a school in which "tools become men". During the 2012 Paralympics, Edwards formed part of the Channel 4 commentary team as well as co-presenting That Paralympic Show with Ade Adepitan.

In 2013, Edwards began co-presenting political discussion show Free Speech for BBC Three alongside Tina Daheley. During the 2015 general election, they presented a series of Free Speech specials.

As a writer, his original film, Burger Van Champion, was commissioned as part of C4’s Coming Up strand in 2013 and was described by the Observer as ‘a remarkable debut’ and by Time Out as ‘funny, touching [and] superbly written’.

In July 2015, Edwards began presenting ITV2 panel show, Safeword which returned for a second series in 2016.

Edwards currently hosts the podcast Science(ish) alongside Dr Michael Brooks, which delves into the science behind popular films. The series proved such a hit that the duo were commissioned by Atlantic to write a book of the same name, Science(ish): The Peculiar Science Behind The Movies, which was published in October 2017 and ranked number 1 in the Physics, Cosmology, and Humorous Essays Amazon charts for several weeks as well as achieving a position of 21 in the overall book charts. The podcast itself has topped the iTunes Science & Medicine chart.

In March 2016, Edwards landed the anchor role on Sky's DC Fancast alongside Bec Hill. He claims this is a true highlight of his career. In January 2017, Edwards began presenting !mpossible, a daytime BBC One quiz show.

From March 2019, Edwards costarred in History's miniseries River Hunters, alongside YouTuber and river-hunter Beau Ouimette.

In September 2021 BBC Radio 5 Live announced that it had hired Edwards to host its new breakfast show alongside Rachel Burden. The new-look 5 Live Breakfast launch took place on 8 November 2021 following Nicky Campbell’s move to a slot later in the day.

Personal life
Edwards has said that he has a very poor sense of smell due to sniffing pure ammonia while in school. Edwards supported green organisation Global Cool in 2010 as part of their Traincation campaign, along with his friend George Lamb.

Edwards married EastEnders and Father Brown actress Emer Kenny in 2016. Their son was born in January 2023.

Filmography
{| class="wikitable"
|+ Television
|-
|-  style="background:#b0c4de; text-align:center;"
! Year
! Title
! Role
! Notes
|-
|2005–2006
|E4 Music
|Presenter
|
|-
|2007
|Fist of Zen
|Narrator
|
|-
|2007–2011
|T4
|Presenter
|
|-
|2008–2012
|T4 on the Beach
|Presenter
|
|-
|2008–2010
|The Hollyoaks Music Show
|Presenter
|
|-
|2008
|Relentless
|Presenter
|1 series
|-
|2009–2010
|Freshly Squeezed
|Presenter
|3 episodes
|-
|2010–2011
|Stars and Strikes
|Presenter
|4 episodes
|-
|2010–2012
|That Paralympic Show
|Co-presenter
|
|-
|2010
|The Real Hustle
|Himself
|
|-
|2011
|Rick and Peter
|Rick
|One-off special
|-
|2011–2012
|Tool Academy
|Presenter
| 3 series
|-
|2011–2017
|Made in Chelsea 
|Presenter
| Special episodes only
|-
|2012
|Games On
|Writer
|Mini series
|-
|2012
|London 2012 Paralympics on Channel 4 
|Commentator
|
|-
|2013
| Stalled 
| Operator
| Voice only
|-
|2013
|Oscar Pistorius: What Really Happened?
|Presenter
|One-off documentary
|-
|2013
|The Cleveland Captives: What Really Happened?
|Presenter
|One-off documentary
|-
|2013
|The Horsemeat Banquet
|Presenter
|One-off documentary
|-
|2013
|Eye Spy
|Presenter
|3 episodes
|-
|2013–2015
|Free Speech
|Co-presenter with Tina Daheley
|
|-
|2013
|Doctor Who Live: The Afterparty
|Co-presenter
|
|-
|2014
| City Limits Live
| Co-presenter with Kate Thornton
| One-off special
|-
|2015
|Revolution Presents: Democracy Dealers
|Himself
|TV film
|-
|2015
|Chewing Gum
|Himself
|1 episode
|-
|2015–2016
|Safeword
|Presenter
|
|-
|2016
|DC Fancast
|Anchor
|
|-
|2016
|Police Interceptors
|Presenter
|3 episodes
|-
|2016
| FHM: The Last of the Lads' Mags
| Narrator
|
|-
|2016–2017
|Debatable
|Panellist
| 8 episodes
|-
|2016
|Celebrity Advice Bureau
|Himself
| 3 episodes
|-
|2016–2017
|Drunk History
|Various
|
|-
|2017–2021
|Impossible
|Presenter
| 8 series (regular)2 series (celebrity)
|-
|2017, 2019
| Richard Osman's House of Games
| Contestant
| Winner; both occasions
|-
|2018
|Fatberg Autopsy: Secrets of the Sewers
|Co-presenter 
|
|-
|2018
|The Bermuda Triangle Enigma
|Co-presenter with Ortis Deley
|3 part series
|-
|2018
| Child Genius
| Contestant
| Winner
|-
|2019
|River Hunters
|Co-presenter with Beau Ouimette
|
|-
|2019
|Make or Break?
|Presenter
|Series 2
|-
|2020
| The Chop: Britain's Top Woodworker'''
| Judge
| 
|-
|2021
| The Scienc(ish) of Stranger Things'| Co-presenter
| 
|-
|2022
|Susan's The Courtship|Presenter
|
|}

BibliographyScience(ish): The Peculiar Science Behind the Movies (2017)None of the Above (2015)Birds of pray'' (1998)

References

External links

5 Live Breakfast (BBC Radio 5 Live)
Rick Edwards T4 profile
Rick Edwards Interview

1979 births
Living people
Alumni of Pembroke College, Cambridge
BBC Radio 5 Live presenters
BBC television presenters
English game show hosts
English radio personalities
People from Enfield, London
Television personalities from London